Banjaran (बंजारन) (transl. Wanderer) is a 1991 Hindi-language Bollywood romance film.  It was directed by 
Harmesh Malhotra. Rishi Kapoor and Sridevi played the main lead roles. Laxmikant–Pyarelal were the music directors. The film was released on 8 November 1991.

Plot
Kumar (Rishi Kapoor) and Reshma (Sridevi) are both mysteriously drawn to each other and realise that they were lovers in their past lives. However, their fathers are furious at this reunion and tries to separate them.

Cast

Rishi Kapoor as Kumar Singh Sesodia / Suraj
Sridevi as Reshma / Devi
Pran as Thakur Baba
Kulbhushan Kharbanda as Rana Udaybhan Singh Sesodia
Raza Murad as Thakur Ranjit Singh
Gulshan Grover as Shakti Singh
Sudhir Pandey as Sardar Malik, tribal leader
Anjana Mumtaz as Mrs. Singh Sesodia
Viju Khote as Bhujangji Maharaj
Rakesh Bedi as Sarju, criver
Sharat Saxena as Girja
Mahavir Shah as Thakur Mahavir Singh
Ram Mohan as Dongar Singh
Renu Arya as Neha Singh, Thakur Ranjit Singh's daughter
Madhu Malhotra as Ambika, Reshma's friend
Rajan Haksar
Birbal

Soundtrack
All lyrics by Anand Bakshi. 'Teri Banjaran', sung by Alka Yagnik, remains a popular song.

References

External links

Hindi cinema
1990s Hindi-language films
1991 films
Films scored by Laxmikant–Pyarelal
Films directed by Harmesh Malhotra